The Fengon ix7 is a SUV sold under the Fengon brand produced from 2019 by chinese car manufacturer DFSK Motor, a joint venture between Dongfeng Motor and Sokon Group. In export markets it is sold as DFSK Glory ix7 and as DFSK Fengon 7 in Belgium.

History 

Presented at the Chengdu show in November 2019, the Fengon ix7 (codenamed "F517") is the flagship model of the DFSK range. Originally called the Fengon (Fengguang) 580 MAX before launch, the Fengon ix7 is based on the Fengon 580 Pro and could be seen as a more upmarket variant.

The mechanics of the ix7 are derived from that of the more compact ix5 but with a longer wheelbase and widened track, and is designed together with the BorgWarner to be able to also adopt all-wheel drive.
Aesthetically, the car has the same stylistic family feeling adopted by the more compact ix5 but with the bodywork typical of seven-seater SUVs, the front characterized by the large grille (chromed or with black strips) that extends from the hood to the bumpers and headlights integrate an LED. In the tail there is the lights connected in a single piece along the entire trunk.

The interior features fully functional instrumentation combined with the 10.5-inch touchscreen multimedia system and climate controls, also touchscreen with a 9-inch display. The passenger compartment has seven seats with the third row foldable into the floor.

Mechanics 
The ix7 shares the same platform as the Fengon 580. At 4.93 meters long, the ix7 shares several components as the smaller ix5 but adopts both the front and all-wheel drive developed by BorgWarner. The engine in front-transverse position. It has McPherson independent front suspension and Multilink independent rear suspension and stabilizer bar. The front brakes are ventilated disc and the rear disc.

All models have six airbags, ABS and EBD, stability and traction control, automatic emergency braking, lane keeping and fatigue detector as standard.

The engine range consists of a single 2.0 GDI Turbo 16-valve four-cylinder petrol engine delivering 231 horsepower and 355 Nm of torque at 1.800 rpm combined with an Aisin 6-speed automatic transmission.

References

External links
Official website

Fengon ix7
Mid-size sport utility vehicles
2010s cars
Cars introduced in 2019